Gandaba: Strings of a Broken Harp is a 2020 Burmese historical & musical-drama film, directed by Aung Ko Latt & Kitaro Kanematsu. It is written by Hector Carosso and it is the second full-length fantasy film of Aung Ko Latt, produced in collaboration with Shochiku Co., Ltd.
and the Japanese Society of Cinematographers. The film was premiered in Myanmar Cinemas on January 23, 2020.

Synopsis
Kalyar's childhood in Burma revived the dreams of an ancient harpist and an ancient lover in Bagan, hoping to become a Burmese harpist like her parents.  Sharing her dreams is Hiroshi, a Shamisen musician from Japan, who met Kalyar and Bagan on his fateful visit to Bagan.  They soon discover that their dreams come true, but there is an unseen danger in the past and present.

Cast
Donnaa Layla as Kalyar, O Kyar Phyu
Shunya Shiraishi as Hiroshi, Nga Phone Thin
Shun Sugata
Win Morisaki
Yan Aung
Khin Zarchi Kyaw
Sithu Maung

References

External links

2020 films
2020s Burmese-language films
Burmese drama films
Films shot in Myanmar